Bossiaea webbii, commonly known as water bush, is a species of flowering plant in the family Fabaceae and is endemic to the south-west of Western Australia. It is an erect, slender shrub with more or less round to kidney-shaped, minutely-toothed leaves and orange-yellow and red, pea-like flowers.

Description

Taxonomy and naming
Bossiaea webbii was first formally described in 1882 by Ferdinand von Mueller in The Chemist and Druggist with Australasian Supplement from specimens collected "on the summit of Mount Lindsay, near King George's Sound". The specific epithet (webbii) honours William Webb, who collected the type specimens.

Distribution and habitat
Water bush grows in jarrah, karri and marri forest and in low, heathy woodland in the Jarrah Forest and Warren biogeographic regions of south-western Western Australia.

Conservation status
Bossiaea webbii is classified as "not threatened" by the Western Australian Government Department of Biodiversity, Conservation and Attractions.

References

webbii
Mirbelioids
Flora of Western Australia
Plants described in 1882
Taxa named by Ferdinand von Mueller